Valérie Favre (born 1959, Evilard, Switzerland) is a Berlin-based artist. Since 2006 she is Professor of painting at the Universität der Künste in Berlin.

Background
Valérie Favre grew up in the Swiss canton of Berne. Having worked as a stage designer and actress at the theater in Paris in the early 1980s she soon turned to the field of painting. After 18 years in France, where she became a well-known and successful visual artist, she finally moved to Berlin in 1998.

History of works 1989–2010
During her career, Favre's works have grown in a series of interconnected cycles, showing references to the different fields of art history, geopolicy, philosophy, theater and film as well as her interest in narration in general.

 1989-1990 Period of the paintings Périmètre
 1991-1994 Period of white paintings
 1992-1994 Creation of objects
 1994-1996 works in sound, Robe Rouge, first work of the series Balls and Tunnels
 1996-1997 works after Pontormo, Velázquez, Watteau, Géricault
 1998 Filets a souvenirs
 1999 Les soeurs malades, beginning of series Lapine Univers
 2000 Series of Intérieurs, Petite filles
 2001 Series of Excercices de vols
 2002-2004 series Autos dans la nuit, series Forêt, beginning of ongoing suicide- series, beginning of series Idiotinnen
 2005-2007 series Bruder Grimm and Columbia Variations, beginning of shortcuts series
 2008 Kakerlaken, Autoscooter, Redescription
 2008-2011 triptychs: series Volière and series Stage

Exhibition history
Favre's work has been exhibited internationally in museums such as K21, Düsseldorf, Germany (2010/2011); Kunstmuseum Lucerne, Switzerland (2009/2010); Carré d'Art Nîmes, France (2009); Centre Georges Pompidou Paris, France (2009); Haus am Waldsee, Berlin, Germany (2006); Westfälischer Kunstverein Münster, Germany (2004); Musée de Picardie Amiens, France (2003); FRAC Auvergne, France (1999).

Favre is represented by the following galleries: Galerie Barbara Thumm, Berlin, Germany; Galerie Jocelyn Wolff, Paris, France, Susanne Vielmetter, Los Angeles, USA, and Galerie Peter Kilchmann, Zurich.

Publications
 “Valérie Favre - Visions”, exh. cat. Carré d'Art Nîmes, Kunstmuseum Luzern, texts by Beatrice von Bismarck, Claire Brunet, Jürgen Harten, Jaqueline Lichtenstein, Hatje Cantz, Ostfildern 2009
 “Valérie Favre - Der dritte Bruder Grimm”, exh. cat. Haus am Waldsee, texts by Katja Blomberg, Alexander Koch, Revolver, Frankfurt 2006
 “Valérie Favre - Mise en Scène”, exh. cat. Westfälischer Kunstverein Münster, texts by Valérie Favre, Carina Plath, Gregor Jansen, Verlag für moderne Kunst Nürnberg, Nürnberg 2004
 “Valérie Favre - Forêts”, exh. cat. Musée de Picardie, texts by Sylvie Couderc, Kerstin Grübmeyer, Amiens 2003
 “Valérie Favre - Sophie et Patrick”, exh. cat. L’Espal, Centre Culturel, text by Marion Casanova, Le Mans 2001
 “Range ta Chambre”, exh. cat. Centre d'Art Contemporain de Basse Normandie, Herouville Saint-Clair 1994

References

External links
 artist homepage on www.valeriefavre.net 
 Barbara Thumm www.bthumm.de  in Berlin, Germany
 Jocelyn Wolff www.galeriewolff.com  in Paris, France
 Susanne Vielmetter www.vielmetter.com  in Los Angeles
 Valérie Favre on Art net
 Valérie Favre on Art News
http://www.berliner-zeitung.de/berlin/ausstellung-val-rie-favre-in-berlin-welt-theater-mit-kassandra,10809148,30725168.html

 
,  

, 

 

 
 

1959 births
Living people
Academic staff of the Berlin University of the Arts
People from Biel/Bienne District
Swiss women painters
Swiss contemporary artists
20th-century Swiss painters
21st-century Swiss painters
20th-century Swiss women artists
21st-century Swiss women artists